Recha may refer to:


People

Marc Recha (born 1970), Catalan Spanish film director and screenwriter

Given name
Recha Sternbuch (1905–1971), Swiss woman who rescued Jews during the Holocaust
Recha Freier (1892–1984), founder of the Youth Aliyah
Recha Charlotte Cohn (1898-1983), German Israeli architect
Recha, a fictional character from the 1779 play Nathan the Wise by Gotthold Ephraim Lessing

Surname
Amy Recha (born 1992), Singaporean footballer

Other
Recha, a Belarusian periodical published by Mikola Abramchyk, Belarusian journalist and émigré politician
Recha, a 2016 album by Dzieciuki, Belarusian folk punk group
573 Recha, a minor planet

See also

Reecha (disambiguation)
Rekha (given name)
Richa